This is a taxonomy of the moth family Tortricidae down to genus level. This classification is up-to-date to 2008, taking information from the Online World Catalogue of the Tortricidae and taxonomic changes made in 2007.

Subfamily Tortricinae

Tribe Archipini

 Abrepagoge
 Acroceuthes
 Acropolitis
 Adoxophyes
 Allodemis
 Ancyroclepsis
 Aneuxanthis
 Anisotenes
 Anthophrys
 Antiphrastis
 Aphelia
 Aphthonocosma
 Archepandemis
 Archidemis
 Archips
 Argyrotaenia
 Aristocosma
 Arizelana
 Ascerodes
 Asteriognatha
 Atelodora
 Authomaema
 Avaria
 Bactrostoma
 Balioxena
 Battalia
 Borboniella
 Borneogena
 Brachyvalva
 Cacoecimorpha
 Callibryastis
 Capua
 Carphomigma
 Catamacta
 Ceramea
 Ceritaenia
 Chionothremma
 Chiraps
 Choanograptis
 Choristoneura
 Claduncaria
 Clepsis
 Coeloptera
 Cornuclepsis
 Cornusaccula
 Cosmiophrys
 Cryptomelaena
 Cryptoptila
 Ctenopseustis
 Cudonigera
 Cununcus
 Cuspidata
 Daemilus
 Dentisociaria
 Diactora
 Dicanticinta
 Dicellitis
 Dichelia
 Dichelopa
 Diedra
 Digitosa
 Diplocalyptis
 Ditula
 Droceta
 Durangarchips
 Dynatocephala
 Ecclitica
 Egogepa
 Electraglaia
 Epagoge
 Epalxiphora
 Epichorista
 Epichoristodes
 Epiphyas
 Ericodesma
 Eurythecta
 Exorstaenia
 Furcataenia
 Furcinula
 Gelophaula
 Geogepa
 Gephyraspis
 Glyphidoptera
 Gnorismoneura
 Gongylotypa
 Goniotorna
 Harmologa
 Hectaphelia
 Heterochorista
 Hiceteria
 Homona
 Homonoides
 Homonopsis
 Hypsidracon
 Idolatteria
 Isochorista
 Isodemis
 Isotenes
 Labidosa
 Leontochroma
 Leptochroptila
 Leucotenes
 Lozotaenia
 Lozotaeniodes
 Lumaria
 Mantua
 Meridemis
 Merophyas
 Mesocalyptis
 Metamesia
 Midaellobes
 Minutargyrotoza
 Neocalyptis
 Niphothixa
 Notioclepsis
 Nuritamburia
 Ochetarcha
 Ochrotaenia
 Orilesa
 Panaphelix
 Pandemis
 Paradichelia
 Paramesia
 Paramesiodes
 Paraphasis
 Pararrhaptica
 Periclepsis
 Peteliacma
 Petridia
 Phaenacropista
 Philedone
 Philedonides
 Philocryptica
 Phlebozemia
 Planostocha
 Planotortrix
 Platyhomonopsis
 Platysemaphora
 Procalyptis
 Procrica
 Pseudeulia
 Pteridoporthis
 Pternozyga
 Ptycholoma
 Ptycholomoides
 Pyrgotis
 Pyrsarcha
 Saetotaenia
 Scotiophyes
 Snodgrassia
 Sorensenata
 Spheterista
 Spinotaenia
 Sychnochlaena
 Sychnovalva
 Syndemis
 Tacertaenia
 Terricula
 Terthreutis
 Thrincophora
 Tosirips
 Tremophora
 Tuckia
 Ulodemis
 Vialonga
 Viettea
 Williella
 Worcesteria
 Xeneda
 Xenophylla
 Xenotemna
 Xenothictis
 Zacorisca

Tribe Atteriini

 Anacrusis
 Archipimima
 Atteria
 Holoptygma
 Sisurcana
 Templemania
 Tina
 Tinacrucis

Tribe Ceracini

 Bathypluta
 Cerace
 Eurydoxa
 Pentacitrotus

Tribe Cnephasiini

 Amphicoecia
 Archicnephasia
 Astrosa
 Cnephasia
 Decodes
 Decodina
 Doloploca
 Drachmobola
 Eana
 Epicnephasia
 Exapate
 Immariana
 Kawabeia
 Mictoneura
 Neosphaleroptera
 Oxypteron
 Paranepsia
 Propiromorpha
 Protopterna
 Pseudargyrotoza
 Sphaleroptera
 Stenopteron
 Synochoneura
 Taeniarchis
 Tortricodes
 Xerocnephasia

Tribe Cochylini

 Acarolella
 Actihema
 Aethes
 Aethesoides
 Agapeta
 Amallectis
 Anielia
 Aphalonia
 Aprepodoxa
 Banhadoa
 Belemgena
 Caraccochylis
 Carolella
 Cartagogena
 Ceratoxanthis
 Chloanohieris
 Cirrothaumatia
 Cochylidia
 Cochylidichnium
 Cochylimorpha
 Cochylis
 Combosclera
 Commophila
 Coristaca
 Cryptocochylis
 Deltophalonia
 Diceratura
 Dinophalia
 Empedcochylis
 Enallcochylis
 Eugnosta
 Eupoecilia
 Falseuncaria
 Fulvoclysia
 Geitocochylis
 Gryposcleroma
 Gynnidomorpha
 Henricus
 Hypostromatia
 Hysterophora
 Juxtolena
 Lasiothyris
 Lincicochylis
 Lorita
 Maricaona
 Marylinka
 Mielkeana
 Mimcochylis
 Mimeugnosta
 Monoceratuncus
 Mourecochylis
 Oligobalia
 Parirazona
 Perlorita
 Phalonidia
 Phaniola
 Phtheochroa
 Phtheochroides
 Planaltinella
 Platphalonidia
 Prochlidonia
 Prohysterophora
 Revertuncaria
 Rigidsociaria
 Rolandylis
 Rudenia
 Saphenista
 Spinipogon
 Tambomachaya
 Tenoa
 Thyraylia
 Thysanphalonia
 Trachybyrsis
 Velhoania
 Vermilphalonia

Tribe Epitymbiini

 Aeolostoma
 Anisogona
 Anisolepida
 Aplastoceros Apoctena Asthenoptycha Capnoptycha Cleptacaca Epitymbia Goboea Macrothyma Meritastis Mimeoclysia Pandurista Polydrachma Rhomboceros Sperchia TrychnophyllaTribe Euliini

 Abancaya Accuminulia Acmanthina Acroplectis Albadea Anopina Anopinella Apolychrosis Apotomops Argentulia Atepa Badiaria Belemclepsis Bicavernaria Bidorpitia Bolbia Bonagota Brazeulia Brusqeulia Chamelania Chapoania Characovalva Chicotortrix Chileulia Chilips Chinchipena Chrysoxena Cincorunia Circapina Clarkenia Clarkeulia Colosyta Corneulia Coryssovalva Crocotania Cuproxena Cylichneulia Deltinea Deltobathra Dimorphopalpa Ditrifa Dogolion Dorithia Ecnomiomorpha Eliachna Eriotortrix Eristparcula Ernocornutia Ernocornutina Eubetia Eulia Euryeulia Ewunia Exoletuncus Galomecalpa Gauruncus Gnatheulia Gorytvesica Gravitcornutia Haemateulia Harposcleritia Hasteulia Helicteulia Hynhamia Hypenolobosa Hyptiharpa Icteralaria Imelcana Inape Joaquima Lanacerta Limeulia Liobba Lobogenesis Lydontopa Marcelina Meridulia Meyathorybia Moneulia Monimosocia Monochamia Moronanita Moronata Neoeulia Neomarkia Nesochoris Netechma Netechmina Netechmodes Nunimeus Odonthalitus Oregocerata Ortognathosia Oryguncus Ozotuncus Palusita Paramonochamia Paraneulia Paraptila Paratepa Parexoletuncus Pinhaisania Placabis Popayanita Proathorybia Proeulia Psedaleulia Pseudapina Pseudomeritastis Psiathovalva Ptoseulia Ptychocroca Ptyongnathosia Punctapinella Punoa Pycnocornuta Quasieulia Ramaperta Ranapa Razowskiina Rebinea Recintona Rhythmologa Romanaria Rubroxena Saetosacculina Sagittranstilla Saopaulista Searenia Seticosta Simanica Sinxema Strophotina Subrebinea Subterinebrica Subtranstillaspis Tapinodoxa Telurips Terinebrica Thalleulia Thoridia Toreulia Transtillaspis Tylopeza Uelia Ulvipinara Uncicida Varifula Vulpoxena XoserTribe Phricanthini

 Chersomorpha Denaeantha Phricanthes ScolioplectaTribe Schoenotenini

 Antigraptis Aphrozestis Archactenis Barygnathella Brongersmia Campotenes Choristenes Copidostoma Cornuticlava Diactenis Dipterina Doridostoma Epitrichosma Homalernis Litotenes Maoritenes Metachorista Neotenes Nesoscopa Oligotenes Palaeotoma Proactenis Proselena Protarchella Prothelymna Rhabdotenes Rhopalotenes Saetotenes Schoenotenes Stenarchella Stenotenes Syncratus Tracholena XenotenesTribe Sparganothini

 Aesiocopa Amorbia Anchicremna Coelostathma Lambertiodes Niasoma Paramorbia Platynota Rhynchophyllis Sparganopseustis Sparganothina Sparganothis Sparganothoides Spatalistiforma Syllonoma Synalocha SynnomaTribe Tortricini

 Accra Acleris Aleimma Algoforma Amboyna Anaccra Anameristes Apotoforma Archigraptis Asterolepis Beryllophantis Brachiolia Cnesteboda Cornesia Eboda Elaeodina Exeristeboda Herotyda Latibulocrinis Nephograptis Panegyra Paraccra Paracroesia Paratorna Pareboda Plinthograptis Polemograptis Pseudeboda Pseudocroesia Reptilisocia Rubidograptis Rubrograptis Russograptis Rutilograptis Sanguinograptis Sclerodisca Sociosa Spatalistis Tortrix Transita Trophocosta Tymbarcha VelloniferUnplaced

 Alytopistis Apateta Apinoglossa Arotrophora Camadeniana Hydaranthes Ioditis Mictopsichia Matronula Orthocomotis Paracomotis Paraphyas Parastranga Peraglyphis Scyphoceros Syllomatia Symphygas TanychaetaSubfamily Olethreutinae
Tribe Bactrini

 Bactra Cyclacanthina Henioloba Parabactra SyntozygaTribe Enarmoniini

 Aemulatrix Aglaogonia Anathamna Ancylis Ancylophyes Anthozela Argyroptocha Balbidomaga Bubonoxena Cimeliomorpha Corethrarcha Crocostola Cyphophanes Dasodis Dasybregma Embolostoma Enarmonia Enarmoniodes Enarmonodes Eucosmogastra Eucosmomorpha Fibuloides Ganabalia Genetancylis Helictophanes Heteroschistis Hystrichophora Irianassa Loboschiza Mehteria Metaselena Neoanathamna Nenomoshia Oriodryas Periphoeba Protancylis Pseudacroclita Pseudancylis Pseudophiaris Pternidora Ruthita Semnostola Sillybiphora Taiwancylis Tetramoera Thymioptila Thysanocrepis Tokuana ToonavoraTribe Endotheniini

 Endothenia Hulda Saliciphaga Taniva TiaTribe Eucosmini

 Acroclita Age Alcina Alischirnevalia Allodapella Allohermenias Anoecophysis Antichlidas Argepinotia Asketria Assulella Azuayacana Barbara Bascaneucosma Bathrotoma Bipartivalva Biuncaria Blastesthia Blastopetrova Brachiocera Brachioxena Catastega Charitostega Chimoptesis Cirrilaspeyresia Clavigesta Coenobiodes Collogenes Cosmetra Crimnologa Crocidosema Crusimetra Demeijerella Dicnecidia Dinogenes Diplonearcha Dolichurella Doliochastis Duessa Eccoptocera Emrahia Epibactra Epiblema Epinotia Episimoides Eriopsela Eucoenogenes Eucosma Eucosmophyes Foveifera Gibberifera Gravitarmata Gretchena Gypsonoma Gypsonomoides Heleanna Hendecaneura Hendecasticha Hermenias Herpystis Herpystostena Holocola Hylotropha Icelita Jerapowellia Kennelia Lepteucosma Macraesthetica Makivora Megaherpystis Melanodaedala Metacosma Mystogenes Namasia Neaspasia Neobarbara Niphadostola Noduliferola Notocelia Nuntiella Osthelderiella Parachanda Parepisimia Pelochrista Penestostoma Peridaedala Phalarocarpa Phaneta Plutographa Potiosa Proteoteras Protithona Pseudexentera Pseudoclita Pseudococcyx Retinia Rhodotoxotis Rhopalovalva Rhopobota Rhyacionia Salsolicola Sociognatha Sonia Spilonota Strepsicrates Stygitropha Suleima Syngamoneura Syropetrova Thiodia Thiodiodes Thylacogaster Tritopterna Whittenella Xenosocia Yunusemreia ZeirapheraTribe Gatesclarkeanini

 Asymmetrarcha Gatesclarkeana Hiroshiinoueana UkameniaTribe Grapholitini

 Acanthoclita Agriophanes Andrioplecta Apocydia Archiphlebia Articolla Bhagwantolita Centroxena Cirriphora Commoneria Coniostola Corticivora Cryptophlebia Cryptoschesis Cydia Dichrorampha Dierlia Diplosemaphora Dracontogena Ecdytolopha Ethelgoda Eucosmocydia Fulcrifera Goditha Grapholita Gymnandrosoma Hyposarotis Ixonympha Karacaoglania Larisa Laspeyresinia Lathronympha Leguminivora Licigena Loranthacydia Lusterala Macrocydia Matsumuraeses Mevlanaia Microsarotis Mimarsinania Muhabbetina Multiquaestia Notocydia Ofatulena Pammene Pammenemima Pammenitis Pammenodes Pammenopsis Parapammene Parienia Procoronis Pseudogalleria Pseudopammene Ricula Riculoides Satronia Selania Sereda Spanistoneura Statignatha Stephanopyga Strophedra Strophedromorpha Talponia Thaumatotibia Thylacandra TitanotocaTribe Microcorsini
 CryptaspasmaTribe Olethreutini

 Acantheucosma Actinocentra Afrocostosa Afroploce Afrothreutes Ahmosia Alexiloga Antaeola Antictenista Antirrhopa Apeleptera Apolobesia Apotomis Apsidophora Arcesis Archilobesia Argyroploce Artiphanes Asaphistis Astronauta Aterpia Atriscripta Atrypsiastis Baburia Bakia Basigonia Bucephalacra Cacocharis Camptrodoxa Capricornia Cellifera Celypha Cephalophyes Cnecidophora Coccothera Cosmopoda Cosmorrhyncha Costosa Cymolomia Dactylioglypha Diakonoffiana Dicephalarcha Didrimys Dolichohedya Dudua Dynatorhabda Eccopsis Engelana Enveryucelia Episimus Eppihus Eremas Eubrochoneura Eudemis Eudemopsis Eumarozia Euobraztsovia Evora Geita Gnathmocerodes Gonomomera Hedya Hilaroptila Hopliteccopsis Hoplitendemis Hystrichoscelus Lepidunca Lipsotelus Lobesia Lobesiodes Megalomacha Megalota Meiligma Mesocharis Metendothenia Metrioglypha Molybdocrates Neohermenias Neopotamia Neorrhyncha Neostatherotis Niphadophylax Oestropa Olethreutes Omiostola Ophiorrhabda Orientophiaris Orthotaenia Oxysemaphora Palaeomorpha Paraeccopsis Paralobesia Pelatea Penthostola Phaecadophora Phaecasiophora Phaulacantha Phiaris Piniphila Podognatha Pomatophora Pristerognatha Prophaecasia Protobactra Proschistis Psegmatica Pseudohedya Pseudohermenias Pseudosciaphila Psilacantha Rhectogonia Rhodacra Rhodocosmaria Rhopaltriplasia Riculorampha Rudisociaria Sambara Selenodes Semniotes Semutophila Sisona Socioplana Sorolopha Stalagmocroca Statheromeris Statheromantis Statherotis Statherotmantis Statherotoxys Stenentoma Stictea Sycacantha Syricoris Teleta Temnolopha Theorica Trachyschistis Triheteracra Tsinilla Xenolepis Xenopotamia Zomaria ZomarianaUnplaced

 Melanalopha EuobraztsoviaSubfamily Chlidanotinae
Tribe Chlidanotini

 Archimaga Auratonota Branchophantis Caenognosis Chlidanota Diabolo Daulocnema Electracma Gnaphalostoma Heppnerographa Iconostigma Leurogyia Macrochlidia Metrernis Monortha Picroxena Pseudocomotis Trymalitis UtrivalvaTribe Hilarographini

 Charitographa Hilarographa Idiothauma Mictocommosis Nexosa Thaumatographa TortrimosaicaTribe Polyorthini

 Apura Ardeutica Biclonuncaria Chlorortha Clonuncaria Cnephasitis Ebodina Epelebodina Histura Histurodes Isotrias Lopharcha Lophoprora Lypothora Macasinia Olindia Polylopha Polyortha Polythora Polyvena Pseudatteria Pseuduncifera Scytalognatha Thaumatoptila XenebodaUnplaced

 Electresia Hetereucosma Laculataria Meridagena Mesochariodes Paramulia Paranthozela Quebradnotia Tortricibaltia Tortricidiosis Tortricites Zerpanotia''
"Thaumatovalva "

References

Tortricidae
 List
Tor